John Callahan (1866 – June 8, 1936) was an American outlaw and bank robber during the closing days of the Old West. He eventually became the leading underworld figure in Wichita, Kansas during Prohibition, specifically becoming involved in bootlegging and narcotics. He was also considered one of the top fences in the Midwestern United States buying negotiable bonds and laundering money.

His partnership with corrupt police officials in the Wichita Police Department allowed the city to become a haven for criminals, much like St. Paul, Minnesota during the 1930s, and served as a mentor to many future outlaws of the "Public Enemy"-era such as Edward J. Adams and Pretty Boy Floyd. Floyd may have, in fact, gotten his start in the underworld by transporting bootleg liquor for Callahan before becoming a bank robber.

Callahan was eventually convicted of drug smuggling and was sentenced to 25 years imprisonment. He would serve only seven years before his release and retired to Wichita where he died in his sleep on June 8, 1936, at age 70.

References

1866 births
1936 deaths
American outlaws
Depression-era gangsters
People from Wichita, Kansas